ArcadiaTownship is an inactive township in Iron County, in the U.S. state of Missouri.

Arcadia Township was established in 1857, taking its name from nearby Arcadia Valley.

References

Townships in Missouri
Townships in Iron County, Missouri
1857 establishments in Missouri